József Bakai (born 13 March 1942) is a Hungarian athlete. He competed in the men's decathlon at the 1972 Summer Olympics.

References

External links
 

1942 births
Living people
Athletes (track and field) at the 1972 Summer Olympics
Hungarian decathletes
Olympic athletes of Hungary
Sportspeople from Somogy County
Universiade silver medalists for Hungary
Universiade medalists in athletics (track and field)
Medalists at the 1965 Summer Universiade